Jenjira Srisaard (born 16 April 1995) is a Thai swimmer.

She competed in the women's 50 metre butterfly and women's 50 metre freestyle events at the 2012 FINA World Swimming Championships (25 m) held in Istanbul, Turkey. The following year, she competed in competed in short course swimming at the 2013 Asian Indoor and Martial Arts Games held in Incheon, South Korea. She also competed at the 2013 Southeast Asian Games held in Naypyidaw, Myanmar.

In 2017, she won two gold medals, two silver medals and three bronze medals in short course swimming at the 2017 Asian Indoor and Martial Arts Games held in Ashgabat, Turkmenistan. In 2018, she competed in swimming at the 2018 Asian Games held in Jakarta, Indonesia.

In 2019, she represented Thailand at the 2019 World Aquatics Championships held in Gwangju, South Korea. She competed in the women's 50 metre butterfly and women's 50 metre breaststroke events and in both events she did not advance to compete in the semi-finals.

In 2021, she represented Thailand at the 2020 Tokyo Olympic Games held in Tokyo, Japan. She competed in Women's 100 metre Freestyle and Women's 50 metre Freestyle events and in both events she did not advance to compete in the semi-finals.

She competed in the women's 4 × 100 metre freestyle relay at the 2022 World Aquatics Championships held in Budapest, Hungary.

References 

Living people
1995 births
Jenjira Srisaard
Female butterfly swimmers
Female breaststroke swimmers
Swimmers at the 2014 Asian Games
Swimmers at the 2018 Asian Games
Jenjira Srisaard
Southeast Asian Games medalists in swimming
Jenjira Srisaard
Jenjira Srisaard
Jenjira Srisaard
Competitors at the 2013 Southeast Asian Games
Competitors at the 2015 Southeast Asian Games
Competitors at the 2017 Southeast Asian Games
Competitors at the 2021 Southeast Asian Games
Swimmers at the 2020 Summer Olympics
Jenjira Srisaard
Jenjira Srisaard
Jenjira Srisaard